Pahanan Agta, also called Paranan Agta or Palanan Agta, is an Aeta language of Palanan, Isabela northern Philippines. Lexically but not grammatically it is extremely close to Paranan, a non-Negrito language with a very similar name. Speaker groups of both languages were together isolated from other communities and remained in constant interaction.

References

Aeta languages
Northeastern Luzon languages
Languages of Isabela (province)